The PowerBook 2400c (codenames: "Comet", "Nautilus") is a subnotebook in Apple Computer's PowerBook range of Macintosh computers, weighing . Manufacturing was contracted to IBM Japan. In a return to the PowerBook 100 form factor, it was introduced in May 1997 as a late replacement for the PowerBook Duo 2300c, which had been the last of the subnotebook PowerBook Duo series. The 2400c was discontinued in March 1998, with no immediate replacement — the model that followed it was the much larger PowerBook G3 Series (known as "Wallstreet"/"Mainstreet"). However, in Japan a 2400c with a 240 MHz CPU (codenamed "Mighty Cat") was offered shortly after the original model's discontinuation, until the end of the year.

Overview
The 2400c uses the same PowerPC 603e processor as the preceding Duo 2300c, but at a much higher CPU clock — 180 instead of 100 MHz. However, the 2400 is unable to utilize the DuoDock like the 2300c was, making the lack of an internal removable drive much more noticeable. Like the PowerBook 100 and Duo series before it, it was sold with an external floppy drive. Apple did not offer a CD-ROM drive for it which was otherwise standard for all other PowerBooks. Unlike the Duo, reinstated peripheral ports on the machine most closely matched those of the original 100 and include: ADB, one combined serial printer/modem port, floppy port (not HDI-20 but unique to the 2400c), HDI-30 SCSI port, but added a VGA video out, as well as a stereo sound out and in, infrared port, and two PCMCIA card slots. The original 180 MHz model's PCMCIA slots officially accept only 2 Type II or 1 Type III PCMCIA-spec cards. But some users have applied simple motherboard modifications to allow the use of Cardbus expansion cards as well, extending the practical life of this subcompact until a replacement was eventually offered by Apple. The Japanese 240 MHz model offered Cardbus as standard. The 2400 is built around a  active matrix color LCD screen, making the computer very compact indeed — it is slightly smaller and lighter, though a bit thicker, than a  iBook, and the fourth-smallest subnotebook behind the  PowerBook G4 introduced several years later. Apple's most recent offering in this category was the discontinued  MacBook.

Due to its processor being located on a detachable daughter card, the PowerBook 2400c saw a small number of PowerPC G3 processor cards created for it. Companies such as Interware(Vimage), and Newer Technologies(NUpowr) offered processor upgrades which would swap out the 603e for a G3 ranging from 240 MHz to 400 MHz.

This was also the last Mac to not ship with a removable media drive until the MacBook Air in 2008.

Timeline

Notes

References

External links
PowerBook 2400c/180 at Apple Computer's AppleSpec
PowerBook 2400c at apple-history.com
PowerBook 2400c at lowendmac.com
PowerBook 2400c/180 and 2400c/240 at EveryMac.com

2400c
PowerPC Macintosh computers